Kazimierz Fabrycy (3 March 1888, Odessa – 18 July 1958) was a Polish general.

Early life
Kazimierz Fabrycy was born on March 3, 1888, in Odessa, in the Kherson Governorate of the Russian Empire. Upon graduating from school in Niemirów he enrolled for a year-long military service in the Russian army. He followed this with enrollment at Polytechnic School of Lviv and then later at the Technical University of Munich. From this latter institution he was conferred a degree in engineering. Even as a student Kazimierz flung himself into activities of the Polish independence movement. Between 1908 and 1910 he co-founded first the Union of Active Struggle and then the Rifle Association.

Later career
Fabrycy was a member of the Polish Legions in World War I, and fought in the Polish Soviet War.

He was the Viceminister of military affairs from 1926 to 1934, and commander of several infantry divisions during the interwar period in the Second Polish Republic.

During the Invasion of Poland of 1939, Fabrycy was the commander of Armia Karpaty and later the Romanian Bridgehead area.

After being evacuated to Romania, he was given assignments of small importance in the recreated Polish Army in the Middle East area. Fabrycy remained in exile, and died in 1958 in London.

Honours and awards

References

1888 births
1958 deaths
Military personnel from Odesa
People from Odessky Uyezd
Polish nobility
Government ministers of Poland
Polish generals
Polish legionnaires (World War I)
Polish people of the Polish–Soviet War
People of the Polish May Coup (pro-Piłsudski side)
Polish military personnel of World War II
Polish exiles
Technical University of Munich alumni
Recipients of the Cross of Independence
Recipients of the Silver Cross of the Virtuti Militari
Grand Crosses of the Order of Polonia Restituta
Recipients of the Cross of Valour (Poland)
Recipients of the Gold Cross of Merit (Poland)
Recipients of the Military Order of the Cross of the Eagle, Class I
Grand Officiers of the Légion d'honneur
Recipients of the Order of the Crown (Romania)
Commanders of the Order of the Crown (Romania)